Lac du Tolerme is a lake in Lot, France. At an elevation of 532 m, its surface area is 0.38 km².

The Lac de Tolerme is located between the communes of Gorses and Sénaillac-Latronquière.

Tolerme